Vélingara is a town located in the Kolda Region of Senegal. It is slightly north of the large 48 km Vélingara crater though the structure's impact origin is still unconfirmed.

The population is primarily composed of Fulani, Soninke, Wolof and Madingo. At the census of 2002 it  numbered 20,806. In 2007, according to official estimates, it had grown to 23,775.

See also
 List of possible impact structures on Earth

References

Populated places in Kolda Region
Communes of Senegal